The Bay Area Reporter is a free weekly LGBT newspaper serving the LGBT communities in the San Francisco Bay Area. It is one of the largest-circulation LGBT newspapers in the United States, and the country's oldest continuously published newspaper of its kind.

Background
Co-founded by Bob Ross and Paul Bentley on April 1, 1971, the Bay Area Reporter—known by locals for most of its history by the initials B.A.R. that were included in its nameplate until April 2011—was originally distributed to gay bars in the South of Market, Castro District, and Polk Gulch areas of San Francisco. Today, the paper is distributed throughout the Bay Area and beyond.

History
The Bay Area Reporter has evolved to become one of the most respected LGBT community newspapers in the United States. Its annual Pride issue in June is the largest and most-read edition of the year. It also features its reader's choice awards on its anniversary in the first week of April, with a special "BESTIES: The LGBT Best of the Bay" (Renamed "The Besties") edition.

In the 1980s, the Bay Area Reporter became a leading source of updated developments about the AIDS crisis; in 1983, the paper broke the story that up to 40 percent of people with AIDS in the United States were from racial and ethnic minorities, shattering a widely held stereotype that AIDS was a "white gay man's disease." In 1998, the paper made headlines around the world with its now-famous "No Obits" headline, marking the significance of HIV treatments by noting the first time since the AIDS epidemic began in 1981 that the newspaper received no death notices in a given week.

With an audited weekly circulation of 29,000, the Bay Area Reporter is the fourth-largest LGBT newspaper in the United States, after New York's Gay City News, the Philadelphia Gay News, and the Washington Blade (its annual souvenir Gay Pride issue in June is the paper's biggest of the year, with a print run of 50,000). The award-winning newspaper is well known for its editorial commentary, investigative reporting, extensive sports journalism, and arts and entertainment writing.

Co-founder Bentley sold his half-interest in the Bay Area Reporter to Ross in 1975, and died of cancer in 1991. Ross, who remained the paper's publisher, died in 2003. The name of the newspaper's parent company, Benro Enterprises Inc. (now BAR Media Inc.), was derived from a combination of Bentley and Ross. The current publisher is Michael Yamashita (who is also president and CEO of BAR Media Inc.), and the current Editor-in-chief is Cynthia Laird.

Assistant editors have included Dennis Conkin, Matthew Bajko, Zak Szymanski (until 2006), and Mark Mardon (until 2006), each of whom contributed breaking news and nationally renowned articles on topics such as public health, social justice, law, race relations, transgender issues, art and music, and politics. Longtime Arts editor is Roberto Friedman. Assistant editors as of 2008 included Bajko, Jim Provenzano (who also wrote a sports column from 1996 to 2006), and Seth Hemmelgarn. For many years, two of the paper's most-read columnists were Wayne Friday, whose "Politics and Poker" column was a must-read for anyone interested in following LGBT-related political goings-on at San Francisco's City Hall and in Sacramento; and leather columnist Marcus Hernandez, better known as Mister Marcus. Friday retired from the newspaper in 2005. Hernandez died in 2009.

The Bay Area Reporter is a founding member of the National Gay Newspaper Guild.

On March 30, 2006, the newspaper published a special edition to celebrate its 35th anniversary. Also, in 2006, columnist Provenzano received a Legacy Award in Journalism Award from the Federation of Gay Games, and returned as an assistant editor.

In 2007, reporter-editors Bajko and Szymanski were honored by the National Lesbian and Gay Journalists Association with second and third place in the organization's "Sarah Pettit Memorial Award for Excellence in LGBT Media" for their collections of LGBT articles published in the Bay Area Reporter during 2006.

In 2009, the GLBT Historical Society in San Francisco launched an online searchable database of the more than 10,000 obituaries and death notices that have appeared in the Bay Area Reporter, starting with the first such article published in the newspaper in 1979; many of the obituaries reflect the catastrophic toll of the AIDS epidemic in San Francisco from the early 1980s through the late 1990s.

In May 2010, the paper created BARtab, a monthly glossy mini-magazine focusing on nightlife events, and edited by Jim Provenzano. In 2014, the BARtab section became a weekly third section of the print and web editions.

The paper celebrated its 40th anniversary with a special edition published April 8, 2011, and with a week-long mini-exhibition and slide show of historic front pages at The GLBT History Museum in the Castro District of San Francisco. The following week saw the Bay Area Reporter completely redesigned.

In April 2013, it was announced that the San Francisco Newspaper Co., which owned the alternative weeklies San Francisco Bay Guardian (now defunct) and SF Weekly and the daily San Francisco Examiner, agreed to purchase a 49 percent minority stake in the Bay Area Reporter. A new company, BAR Media, Inc., was created, with Michael Yamashita, the newspaper's longtime general manager, becoming publisher with a 31 percent ownership. The Bob Ross Foundation, parent of Benro Enterprises Inc., would own 20 percent while Todd Vogt and Patrick Brown, the principal owners of the San Francisco Newspaper Co., would own the remaining 49 percent. Under the new structure, Yamashita became president and CEO of BAR Media Inc., while Thomas E. Horn, the foundation's executive director and the paper's publisher from 2003 to 2013, was named chairman of the board. Brown became the new company's vice president and chief financial officer.

Yamashita is the first Asian-American publisher of an LGBT newspaper in the United States.

Under the new structure, the Bay Area Reporter gained a larger advertiser base and an expansion of the paper's distribution to parts of the San Francisco Bay Area it had never circulated before, including Contra Costa, San Mateo and Santa Clara counties. By October 2013, the newspaper's offices and newsroom were moved from its longtime building on Ninth Street in the South of Market area to the 17th-floor headquarters of the San Francisco Newspaper Co. at 225 Bush Street in the city's downtown Financial District. In July 2014, the Bay Area Reporters staff relocated to their current location at 44 Gough Street, Suite 204, San Francisco, CA 94103.

The Bay Area Reporter bases its claim as America's oldest continuously published LGBT newspaper on the fact that the Washington Blade, which was founded 18 months earlier than the Bay Area Reporter, in October 1969, abruptly halted publication in November 2009 following the bankruptcy of its parent company, Window Media. Employees of the Blade quickly launched a new publication, DC Agenda''', and subsequently relaunched the Blade in April 2010 after acquiring its assets, copyrights and trademarks in U.S. Bankruptcy Court.

The San Francisco South of Market Leather History Alley consists of four works of art along Ringold Alley honoring leather culture; it opened in 2017. One of the works of art is metal bootprints along the curb which honor 28 people (including Marcus Hernandez, a Bay Area Reporter leather columnist) who were an important part of the leather communities of San Francisco.

March 2020 brought a severe drop in advertising due to the COVID-19 pandemic. Despite two staff layoffs, the newspaper continued to publish, but with a reduced page count. Jim Provenzano took on the dual job of Arts & Nightlife Editor.

In April 2021, the Bay Area Reporter celebrated its 50th anniversary with an expanded commemorative issue that included multiple feature articles recounting highlights of the paper's coverage in news, politics, arts, and nightlife. Issuu.com

In late April, 2021, the GLBT Historical Society - GLBT History Museum published an online exhibit about the paper's 50 years, guest-curated by contributing photojournalist Rick Gerharter, titled Stories of Our Movement: the Bay Area Reporter at 50.

Through March 2022, in addition to its ongoing regular coverage, the newspaper will highlight prominent articles from each year in weekly 50 Years in 50 Weeks short articles. The newspaper also revived its YouTube channel to post short event videos, and monthly online chats focusing on various topics about the newspaper's five decades of coverage. The series is produced by Arts & Nightlife Editor Jim Provenzano.

Online Archives
The Bay Area Reporter is archived on two different websites. Editorial contents published weekly on the website the newspaper launched in 2005  are retained on that site in a searchable archive. In addition, the complete series of issues from 1971 to 2005 is being digitized and posted online by GLBT Historical Society in San Francisco, which preserves the most complete collection of print issues; the first group covering 2000 to 2005 was released in January 2018, and the society projects publication of the remaining issues from 1971 to 2000 by the end of 2018. Both archives are available to all users free of charge.

See alsoSan Francisco Sentinel''
LGBT culture in San Francisco

References

External links
 Bay Area Reporter official website
 Bay Area Reporter Online Archives (1971–2005): Complete Searchable Issues
 GLBT Historical Society: Online Database of B.A.R. Obituaries
 The GLBT History Museum

LGBT culture in San Francisco
LGBT-related newspapers published in the United States
Newspapers published in the San Francisco Bay Area
Newspapers established in 1971
1970s LGBT literature
1980s LGBT literature
1990s LGBT literature
1971 establishments in California
Weekly newspapers published in California